The 2002 USL A-League was an American Division II league run by the United Soccer League during the summer of 2002.

League standings

Eastern Conference

Northeast Division

Southeast Division

Western Conference

Central Division

Pacific Division

The 2002 USL A-League points system was 4 points for a win, 1 point for a draw, 0 points for a loss + 1 bonus point when scoring three or more goals in a game.

Playoff bracket
{{12TeamBracket | legs = 2/2/2/1 | aggregate = y
| RD1=First Round
| RD2=Conference Semifinals
| RD3=Conference Finals
| RD4=Final
| group1=Western Conference
| group2=Eastern Conference
| group3=

| RD1-team01=Portland Timbers
| RD1-score01-1=0
| RD1-score01-2=0
| RD1-score01-agg=0
| RD1-team02=Vancouver Whitecaps
| RD1-score02-1=1
| RD1-score02-2=1
| RD1-score02-agg=2

| RD1-team03=Minnesota Thunder
| RD1-score03-1=2
| RD1-score03-2=1
| RD1-score03-agg=3
| RD1-team04=El Paso Patriots
| RD1-score04-1=1
| RD1-score04-2=1
| RD1-score04-agg=2

| RD1-team05=Richmond Kickers
| RD1-score05-1=1
| RD1-score05-2=2
| RD1-score05-agg=3
| RD1-team06=Atlanta Silverbacks
| RD1-score06-1=1
| RD1-score06-2=1
| RD1-score06-agg=2

| RD1-team07=Montreal Impact 
| RD1-score07-1=0
| RD1-score07-2=1
| RD1-score07-agg={{nowrap|1 (6)}}
| RD1-team08=Charlotte Eagles
| RD1-score08-1=1
| RD1-score08-2=0
| RD1-score08-agg=1 (5)

| RD2-team01=Seattle Sounders
| RD2-score01-1=0
| RD2-score01-2=2
| RD2-score01-agg=2
| RD2-team02=Vancouver Whitecaps| RD2-score02-1=2
| RD2-score02-2=6
| RD2-score02-agg=8

| RD2-team03=Milwaukee Rampage| RD2-score03-1=0
| RD2-score03-2=2
| RD2-score03-agg=2
| RD2-team04=Minnesota Thunder
| RD2-score04-1=0
| RD2-score04-2=1
| RD2-score04-agg=1

| RD2-team05=Charleston Battery
| RD2-score05-1=2
| RD2-score05-2=1
| RD2-score05-agg=3
| RD2-team06=Richmond Kickers| RD2-score06-1=1
| RD2-score06-2=3
| RD2-score06-agg=4

| RD2-team07=
| RD2-score07-1=0
| RD2-score07-2=1
| RD2-score07-agg=1
| RD2-team08=Montreal Impact
| RD2-score08-1=0
| RD2-score08-2=0
| RD2-score08-agg=0

| RD3-team01=Milwaukee Rampage 
| RD3-score01-1=0
| RD3-score01-2=2
| RD3-score01-agg=2
| RD3-team02=Vancouver Whitecaps
| RD3-score02-1=0
| RD3-score02-2=1
| RD3-score02-agg=1

| RD3-team03=Rochester Raging Rhinos
| RD3-score03-1=1
| RD3-score03-2=0
| RD3-score03-agg=1 (8)
| RD3-team04=Richmond Kickers 
| RD3-score04-1=1
| RD3-score04-2=0
| RD3-score04-agg=

| RD4-team01=Milwaukee Rampage 
| RD4-score01=2
| RD4-team02=Richmond Kickers
| RD4-score02=1

}}

Playoff first round

Charlotte vs Montreal

Montreal advances on penalties after series tied 1–1 on aggregate.

Richmond vs Atlanta

Richmond advances 3–2 on aggregate.

Minnesota vs El Paso

Minnesota advances 3–2 on aggregate.

Vancouver vs Portland

Vancouver Whitecaps advance 2–0 on aggregate.

Conference semifinals

Eastern Conference Semifinal 1

The Rochester Rhinos advanced 1–0 on aggregate.

Eastern Conference Semifinal 2

The Richmond Kickers advanced 4–3 on aggregate.

Western Conference Semifinal 1

The Milwaukee Rampage advanced 2–1 on aggregate.

Western Conference Semifinal 2

The Vancouver Whitecaps advanced 8–2 on aggregate.

Conference finals

Eastern Conference

The Richmond Kickers advanced.

Western Conference

The Milwaukee Rampage advanced.

FinalMPV: John Wolyniec

Points leaders

Awards and All A-League teamsAll A-League First TeamF: Brian Ching Seattle Sounders); McKinley Tennyson (Portland Timbers) (Co-Leading Goalscorer); Eduardo Sebrango (Montreal Impact) (Co-Leading Goalscorer)
M: Andrew Gregor (Seattle Sounders); Leighton O'Brien (Seattle Sounders); Brian Piesner (Atlanta Silverbacks); Lenin Steenkamp (Rochester Raging Rhinos)
D: Gabriel Gervais (Montreal Impact);  Destin Makumbu (Milwaukee Rampage); Mark Watson (Defender of the Year)
G: Dusty Hudock (Charleston Battery) (Goalkeeper of the Year)
Coach: Brian Schmetzer Seattle Sounders) (Coach of the Year)All A-League Second TeamF: Fadi Afash (Portland Timbers) (Co-Leading Goalscorer'''); Josh Henderson (Richmond Kickers); Johnny Menyongar (Minnesota Thunder)
M: Mauro Biello (Montreal Impact); Luis da Gama (El Paso Patriots); Jose Gomez (Charlotte Eagles); Steve Kindel (Vancouver Whitecaps)
D: Craig Demmin (Rochester Raging Rhinos); Linval Dixon (Charleston Battery); Mark Schulte (Minnesota Thunder)
G: Preston Burpo (Seattle Sounders)

See also
2002 U.S. Open Cup
2002 Voyageurs Cup

References

External links
 The Year in American Soccer - 2002
 2002 A-League results

2002
2
2002 in Canadian soccer